Stoke City Football Club is an English professional football club based in the city of Stoke-on-Trent, Staffordshire. The club was formed in 1863 and played their first competitive match in November 1883 in the FA Cup. They were founder members of the Football League in 1888, in which they struggled finishing bottom in the first two seasons and failed to gain re-election for the 1890–91 meaning that they played in the Football Alliance. They won the Alliance and re-joined the league. Stoke continued to struggle financially and in 1908 the club was liquidated and had to resign from the league. They re-branded as Stoke F.C. (1908) and joined the Birmingham & District League and Southern Football League before regaining their league status for the 1919–20 season.

As a Football League team Stoke have won two divisional titles at the second and third levels of the English football league system. They have been promoted eight times and suffered relegation on seven occasions. They played in the 2011 FA Cup Final, losing to Manchester City and their best achievement is in the League Cup which they beat Chelsea in the 1972 Final. As of the end of the 2021–22 season, the club has spent 62 seasons in the top tier of the English football league system, 45 in the second and 8 in the third.

History
Stoke were formed as Stoke Ramblers F.C. in 1863 they soon dropped the 'Ramblers' name and simply became known as Stoke F.C., and they played in friendlies against local and national sides as well as competing in the Staffordshire Senior Cup which was a prestigious competition at the time. Stoke entered the FA Cup in the 1883–84 season and their first competitive fixture was against Manchester which they lost 2–1. They continued with this type of fixture list until in 1888 the Football League was founded and Stoke became founder members. In the first league season Stoke finished bottom of the table and again took bottom spot in the second season leading to the club being replaced by Sunderland. Stoke joined the Football Alliance and claimed the title and were re-elected back into the league. Stoke continued to struggle and had a number of narrow escapes from relegation in the early 1900s. Eventually the club's fortunes ran out and they were relegated to the Second Division in the 1906–07. The next season Stoke's finances dried up and the club was liquidated and they had to resign from the league. They were saved by a number of local business men and incredibly they were able to apply for re-election but they failed to gain enough votes and had to enter the Birmingham & District League and Southern Football League.

Stoke re-entered the League after World War I and during the 1920s the club added 'City' to their name and had the highs of being promoted to the First Division and the lows of being relegated to the Third Division North. Despite the divisional changes Stoke brought through a number of promising youth players most notably that of Stanley Matthews. Stoke went on to gain promotion to the First Division in the 1932–33 season and went on to finished in 4th place in the 1935–36 season, their highest position until that point. Immediately after World War II Stoke were involved in a title race and they had the chance to become champions of England for the first time on the final day of the 1946–47 season they needed to beat Sheffield United to claim the title, but they lost 2–1 and ended up finishing 4th for the second time.

Relegation to the Second Division was suffered in the 1952–53 season and it took Stoke ten season to get back into the First Division with Tony Waddington helping Stoke to gain promotion. He had a successful time at Stoke leading the club to their first major trophy in 1972, winning the Football League Cup as well as reaching the semi-final of the FA Cup and competed in European football on two occasions. However Stoke's Victoria Ground was damaged by gale-force winds in January 1976 and the club had to sell their best players to cover the cost for the repairs. This eventually led to Stoke being relegated the following 1976–77 season, Stoke soon made a return though gaining promotion in 1978–79 season. In the 1984–85 season Stoke experienced a terrible season finishing bottom after picking up a record low of 17 points. Five seasons of Second Division obscurity followed before the club slipped into the third tier for the second time.

Lou Macari got Stoke out of the Third Division at the second time of asking and guided the club to the 1995–96 play-offs but lost out to Leicester City. Stoke moved to the all-seater Britannia Stadium in 1997 but were relegated to the third tier in the first season at the new ground. Four seasons in Division Two followed during which time the club had won their second Football League Trophy and entered the play-offs three times eventually gaining promotion at the third attempt. Tony Pulis became Stoke manager in November 2002 and lead the club to safety on the final day of the 2002–03 season. He was sacked at the end of the 2004–05 season but was re-appointed by returning chairman Peter Coates in July 2006. He led the club to promotion to the Premier League in 2007–08 season and has since helped the club to establish themselves back in English football's top tier. Stoke reached the FA Cup Final for the first time in the 2010–11 season losing 1–0 to Manchester City. On reaching the final Stoke qualified for the UEFA Europa League where they reached the last 32, losing out to Valencia. Pulis was replaced by Mark Hughes in May 2013 and he guided the club to their highest Premier League position of 9th in three successive seasons 2013–14, 2014–15 and 2015–16. Decline set in under Hughes in 2016–17 which led to relegation in 2017–18.

Key

Key to league record:
Pld – Matches played
W – Matches won
D – Matches drawn
L – Matches lost
GF – Goals for
GA – Goals against
Pts – Points
Pos – Final position

Key to colours and symbols:

Key to rounds:
Prelim – Preliminary round
GS –  Group stage
QR3 – Third qualifying round
QR4 – Fourth qualifying round, etc.
R1 – First round
R2 – Second round, etc.
QF – Quarter-final
SF – Semi-final
3rdP – Third place
F – Finalists
W – Winners
DQ – Disqualified
DNE – Did not enter

Seasons

Notelist

References

External links

Seasons
 
Stoke City